William Lenthall (died 1702) was the member of Parliament for Wallingford in October 1679 and Cricklade in 1681.

References 

English MPs 1681
Members of the Parliament of England (pre-1707) for Cricklade
1702 deaths
Members of the Parliament of England for Wallingford
English justices of the peace